Eurhoptus is a genus of hidden snout weevils in the family of beetles known as Curculionidae. There are at least eight described species in Eurhoptus.

In 2018, researchers Robert S. Anderson and Michael S. Caterino revised the genus Eurhoptus, resurrecting the species E. curtus and adding five new species, E. aenigmaticus, E. cariniventris, E. imbricatus, E. occidentalis, and E. rileyi.

Species
These species belong to the genus Eurhoptus:
 Eurhoptus aenigmaticus Anderson & Caterino, 2018
 Eurhoptus cariniventris Anderson & Caterino, 2018
 Eurhoptus curtus (Hamilton, 1893) (resurrected name, 2018)
 Eurhoptus imbricatus Anderson & Caterino, 2018
 Eurhoptus occidentalis Anderson & Caterino, 2018
 Eurhoptus pyriformis LeConte, 1876 i c b
 Eurhoptus rileyi Anderson & Caterino, 2018
 Eurhoptus sordidus (LeConte, 1876) i cData sources: i = ITIS, c = Catalogue of Life, g = GBIF, b = Bugguide.net

References

Further reading

 
 
 

Cryptorhynchinae
Articles created by Qbugbot